Alperen is a Turkish masculine given name. The name is derived from the words "Alp" which means "hero" or "brave", and "eren" which means "saint" or "mystic" in Turkish. The name "Alperen" has a strong and powerful meaning, and it is often associated with the qualities of courage, strength, and honor.

Today, the name "Alperen" is still commonly used in Turkey and other parts of the world with Turkish-speaking populations. It may refer to:

 Alperen Acet (born 1998), Turkish athlete specialising in the high jump
 Alperen Babacan (born 1997), Turkish professional footballer
 Alperen Duymaz (born 1992), Turkish actor and model
 Alperen Şengün (born 2002), Turkish professional basketball player
  Alperen Uysal (born 1994), Turkish professional footballer

Turkish masculine given names